The Palace of Linares (Spanish: Palacio de Linares) is a palace located in Madrid, Spain. It was declared national historic-artistic monument (precursor of the status of Bien de Interés Cultural) in 1976. Located at the plaza de Cibeles.

References 

Palaces in Madrid
Bien de Interés Cultural landmarks in Madrid
Calle de Alcalá
Buildings and structures in Recoletos neighborhood, Madrid